Tamás Hornyánszky (born 1 February 1942) is a Hungarian former swimmer. He competed in the men's 400 metre freestyle at the 1960 Summer Olympics.

References

1942 births
Living people
Hungarian male swimmers
Olympic swimmers of Hungary
Swimmers at the 1960 Summer Olympics
Swimmers from Budapest
Hungarian male freestyle swimmers
20th-century Hungarian people
21st-century Hungarian people